The William Garrett Plantation is a plantation complex with a plantation house located near the town of San Augustine in San Augustine County, Texas. The house was "Texas frontier architecture" with some elements of Greek Revival and is notable for its "grandiose" scale.

The National Register of Historic Places listed it in 1977.

Enslaved people built the house in 1861 with lumber from a Garrett sawmill and rock from a Garrett quarry.

See also

National Register of Historic Places listings in San Augustine County, Texas
Recorded Texas Historic Landmarks in San Augustine County

References

External links

Plantation houses in Texas
Buildings and structures in San Augustine County, Texas
Greek Revival houses in Texas
Houses on the National Register of Historic Places in Texas
National Register of Historic Places in San Augustine County, Texas
Recorded Texas Historic Landmarks